Marianna Hill ( Schwarzkopf, February 9, 1942) is an  American actress  who is known for her starring roles in the Western films El Condor (1970) and High Plains Drifter and the cult horror film Messiah of Evil (both 1973), as well as many roles on television series in the 1960s and 1970s. She was sometimes credited as Mariana Hill.

Early years
Marianna Hill was born in Santa Barbara, California, to architect Frank Schwarzkopf and writer Mary Hawthorne Hill, who worked as a script doctor. United States Army General Norman Schwarzkopf Jr. is her cousin.

Her father, a building contractor, worked in several countries, which resulted in Hill's education in California, Spain, and Canada. During her teenage years, her family settled in Southern California when her father purchased a restaurant there.

Career

Hill's initial acting experience came when she was an apprentice at the Laguna Playhouse. She then worked three summers at the La Jolla Playhouse, and later gained more experience at the Neighborhood Playhouse School of the Theatre. She was a life member of The Actors Studio as of January 1980.

She adopted her mother's surname ("Hill") as her professional surname. She has appeared in more than 70 films and television episodes.

Her film debut came in Married Too Young (1962). She played Gabrielle in the Howard Hawks film, Red Line 7000 (1965) and featured in the Elvis Presley film Paradise, Hawaiian Style (1966); the Haskell Wexler political film Medium Cool (1969); the western El Condor (1970); the Clint Eastwood film High Plains Drifter (1973) as Callie Travers; the cult classic horror-thriller film The Baby (1973); and in The Godfather Part II (1974) as Deanna Dunn-Corleone, Fredo Corleone's hard-drinking wife.

Hill guest-starred in several 1960s sitcoms, including My Three Sons, Hogan's Heroes and Love American Style, as well as in the original Star Trek series ("Dagger of the Mind", 1966, as Dr. Helen Noel) and Perry Mason ("The Case of the Greek Goddess", 1963, as Theba). She guest-starred in Bonanza, Death Valley Days,  The High Chaparral, Gunsmoke, The Wild Wild West, Dr. Kildare , The F.B.I., Mission: Impossible, Quincy, M.E., S.W.A.T., Kung Fu, The Outer Limits, Mannix, Batman, Daniel Boone, The Tall Man, and the first pilot movie for Harry O. Hill's final TV guest appearance was in a 1984 episode of Remington Steele.

After moving to New York to teach at the Lee Strasberg Theatre Institute, Hill moved to England in 1988 to teach at the Lee Strasberg Studio in London. She remained there until its closure in 2001. Hill continued to teach at the Method Studio in London, and made an appearance in the 2005 British film Coma Girl: The State of Grace, a part she got through the association of one of her students with the film's writer and director Dina Jacobsen.

Her last American film was Chief Zabu, which was filmed on the campus of Bard College in New York in 1986. The film was not released until 2016. In a rare public appearance, Hill attended the premier of the movie at the 2016 Fort Lauderdale Film Festival.

Hill lives in London, England and still teaches acting privately and at acting workshops. She was scheduled to make an appearance at the Destination Star Trek Germany convention in June 2021 however the convention was postponed due to the COVID-19 pandemic.

Filmography

1962: Married Too Young as Marla
1963: Gunsmoke as Annie
1963: Black Zoo as Audrey
1963: Wives and Lovers (uncredited)
1964: Outer Limits as Nina Link
1964: The New Interns as Sandy
1964: Roustabout as Viola (uncredited)
1964: Bonanza as Dolores Tenino (episode: "Ponderosa Matador")
1965: That Funny Feeling (1965) Kitty (uncredited)
1965: Red Line 7000 as Gabrielle
1966: Paradise, Hawaiian Style as Lani Kaimana
1966: Star Trek (episode: "Dagger of the Mind") as Helen Noel
1967: Batman as Cleo Patrick
1968: Mission Impossible as Luisa Rojas 
1968: Mannix as Marcie
1969: Hogan's Heroes "The Gasoline War" as Louisa
1969: Medium Cool as Ruth
1969: The High Chaparral as Juanita
1969: Daniel Boone as Nancy Hanks
1969: Mayberry RFD as Renee
1970: Love American Style as Angelica Stone (segment: "Love and the Gangster")
1970: El Condor as Claudine
1970: The Traveling Executioner as Gundred Herzallerliebst
1972: Thumb Tripping as Lynne
1973: Messiah of Evil as Arletty
1973: The Baby as Germaine Wadsworth
1973: Harry O as Mildred
1973: High Plains Drifter as Callie Travers 
1974: The Last Porno Flick as Mary
1974: The Godfather Part II as Deanna Corleone
1976: Death at Love House as Lorna Love
1978: The Astral Factor as Bambi Greer (re-released in 1984 as Invisible Strangler)
1980: Schizoid as Julie
1980: Blood Beach as Catherine Hutton
2005: Coma Girl: The State of Grace as Mrs. Anderson
2016: Chief Zabu as Jennifer Holding

References

External links

 
 

1942 births
Living people
American expatriates in Canada
American expatriates in England
American expatriates in Spain
American film actresses
American television actresses
Actresses from Santa Barbara, California
People from Santa Barbara, California
American people of German descent
20th-century American actresses